Roadshow Players was a traveling theatre troupe that performed for children in the 1970s and 1980s in Southern California.

The group was organized as a non-profit organization in the state of California. It was started by actor Joseph Sheppard who directed and produced most of the performances.

The original play performed was called Tails, and consisted of original and adapted fairy tales.  Sheppard wrote the script along with Kevin Center and Patricia Brandow as an entry to the 1977 Los Angeles Valley College one-act play festival.  Actor Center took the Best Supporting Actor award at the festival for his portrayal of the Frog in an adapted version of the classic fairy tale The Frog Prince.

The group was invited to perform the play at the Sunland-Tujunga branch of the Los Angeles Public Library in the summer of 1977.

After Sheppard graduated from the Theatre Academy  at Los Angeles City College, he contacted former members of the 1977 cast and put together a touring company that performed the "Tails" script at Public Libraries and children's charitable organizations throughout the Southern California.

Demand for the group grew.  Sheppard and Center wrote a series of additional shows named "Tails Too", "Tails of Tails", "Tails of more Tails", "Tails Gold" and Christmas Tails.

By 1982, the group was in such demand that one Christmas show required three complete casts and crews in order to fulfill all of the requests for performances.

One cast and crew were formed and dedicated exclusively to performances at the Los Angeles Zoo.

In December 1982, Sheppard retired from the group to seek other opportunities. Kevin Center took over the organization and produced shows until 1984.

Notable performance locations
 Children's Hospital Los Angeles
 Hathaway Home for Children
 Los Angeles Blind Children's Center
 Los Angeles Children's Museum
 Los Angeles Zoo
 Pasadena Public Library
 Sunair Home for Asthmatic Children

Cast and crew
 Ceptembre Anthony
 Mary Baker
 Sherry Berrens
 Roger Bezanis
 Brian T. Brady
 Pat Brandow
 Barbara Brouse
 Scott Brown
 Kathy Burmeister
 Bob Cates
 Kenny Cates
 Kevin Center
 Christopher Dean Cory
 Mike Demke
 John Eickemeyer
 Beth Enari
 Kira Enari
 Treece Franks
 Sidnie Gallien
 Don Goetter
 Clare Gwinn
 Phyllis Harvey
 Wendy Hughes
 Mark Hunter
 Dane Jones
 Nick Karsai (Kernetics)
 Karen Kuehne
 Will Markland
 Jeff Okabayashi
 Dan Penn
 Teri Rash (Demke)
 Katie Santini
 Sue Sarricione
 Jimmy Sheppard
 Joseph Sheppard
 Tim Simpson
 Mike Slifkin
 Carolyn Stone
 Donna Sweet
 Jane Sweet (Sheppard)
 Keeli Tebeau
 John A. Wade
 Debbie Ward
 Marti Ward

External links
RoadShow Players Website

Theatre companies in California